Francisco Antonio Argüello Benitez (born 12 August 1982) is a Paraguayan football manager and player who plays as a midfielder for Recoleta.

Argüello spent most of his career playing for several clubs in the Liga de Fútbol Profesional Boliviano.

Club career
Argüello joined Real Mamoré in 2006 at the age of 26, and played 35 games for the team during his first year.  In 2007, he was named Best Player for Real Mamore, as he helped the club to avoid relegation.

Argüello then signed with Oriente Petrolero in 2009, where in his 1st season he helped the team to qualify for Copa Sudamericana. On 21 September of that year, suffered a double break of his lower right leg during an away match against Colombia's Deportes Tolima in Copa Sudamericana. As Argüello tried to shoot on goal, Tolima's defender John Hurtado attempted to block the shot with his foot. Hurtado caught Argüello on the shin with the sole of his foot as Argüello struck the shot, and the combined force of Argüello swinging leg and Hurtado's lunging block caused Argüello's Tibia and Fibua to break. Currently, the extent of the damage is unknown and no return date has been set for Argüello. Hurtado received a yellow card for the foul.

In June 2012, Argüello signed for Blooming.

Coaching career
Argüello functioned as an assistant manager under Julio César Baldivieso in several clubs. In December 2019, he was officially appointed manager of Aurora, this time with Baldi as his assistant. Baldivieso could not appear as a coach in the official matches, after he already led Club Always Ready in the current 2019 Bolivian Primera División season and, according to the rules, a head coach cannot lead to two clubs in the same contest. For that reason, Argüello was appointed manager.

References

External links
 
 
 Argüello otra vez de titular

1982 births
Living people
People from Villarrica, Paraguay
Paraguayan footballers
Paraguayan football managers
Paraguayan expatriate footballers
Association football midfielders
Municipal Real Mamoré players
Oriente Petrolero players
Club Blooming players
Ñublense footballers
Paraguayan expatriate sportspeople in Chile
Paraguayan expatriate sportspeople in Bolivia
Expatriate footballers in Bolivia
Expatriate footballers in Chile
Club Aurora managers
Universitario de Sucre managers